Kronprinz Wilhelm may refer to:

 William, German Crown Prince (1882–1951), last crown prince of the German Empire
 , an auxiliary cruiser converted from a civilian liner in 1914, surrendered to the United States in 1915
 , a König-class battleship, renamed as Kronprinz Wilhelm in 1918